The 2015 Tour de France was the 102nd edition of the race, one of cycling's Grand Tours. The Tour started in Utrecht, Netherlands on 4 July and finished on the Champs-Élysées in Paris on 26 July. On 21 July, between stages 16 and 17 there was a rest day in Gap.

Classification standings

Stage 12

16 July 2015 — Lannemezan to Plateau de Beille, 

This mountainous stage began in Lannemezan, and headed south-east to an early intermediate sprint at Saint-Bertrand-de-Comminges. The race then continued east through Payssous and Aspet, where it turned south. After the peloton passed through Sengouagnet, the peloton turned east again and the  climb of the category 2 Col de Portet d'Aspet at  began, with an average gradient of 9.7%. The riders then descended east towards Seix, following the valley through to Massat and, turning south, where the  climb of the category 1 Port de Lers at  began, with an average gradient of 6%. The race then descended to the valley floor at Tarascon-sur-Ariège to the east, which continued to Les Cabannes. This was a winding  climb south from Les Cabannes, with a gradient of 7.9%.

Stage 13
17 July 2015 — Muret to Rodez, 

This hilly intermediate stage began in Muret heading east through the southern outskirts of Toulouse, with racing officially starting after passing through Venerque. After turning north-east and travelling through Villefranche-d'Albigeois, the hills began. The riders then went through Valence-d'Albigeois and eventually turned north. From here, the route into Rodez was not flat, although the climb to La Primaube was not categorised. The  descent into Rodez allowed for a fast finish.

Stage 14
18 July 2015 — Rodez to Mende, 

This intermediate mountain stage departed from Rodez heading south to Flavin. The race then turned east to Pont-de-Salars, before quickly reaching the  category 4 climb of the Côte de Pont-de-Salars, at a gradient of 5.8%. The race continued south-east through Salles-Curan, descending from the plateau at the Col de la Vernhette, before eventually heading east. There was an intermediate sprint on the way into Millau, where the riders then turned north-east. The race then continued through the Gorges du Tarn passing Rivière-sur-Tarn, Les Vignes and La Malène. The riders then continued along a plateau, before a descent to Balsieges and a turn west. The race travelled through Mende itself; the finish line was further on, at the opposite side of the city.

Stage 15
19 July 2015 — Mende to Valence, 

The race then descended through Jaujac to an intermediate sprint at Aubenas, before turning north-east. The race turned north-east again, heading through La Voulte-sur-Rhône and Charmes-sur-Rhône to Guilherand-Granges. Crossing the Rhône, the race then headed through the centre of Valence to the finish line.

Stage 16
20 July 2015 — Bourg-de-Péage to Gap, 

This medium mountain stage departed from Bourg-de-Péage heading west, with racing officially starting just before reaching Granges-les-Beaumont, with racing being generally uphill for most of the day. Taking a route south through Montélier and Chabeuil to Crest, the riders turned east to Espenel and then headed north to Sainte-Croix. Heading east, an intermediate sprint took place at Die and the riders turned south-east to travel through Luc-en-Diois. Continuing east, the race went through Veynes and La Freissinouse before descending into Gap for the first time. The race then descended south and then west back into Gap, to the finish line.

Rest Day 2
21 July 2015 — Gap

Stage 17

22 July 2015 — Digne-les-Bains to Pra-Loup, 

This mountain stage began in Digne-les-Bains heading south, with racing officially starting just outside the town centre at Les Dieyes. The peloton turned south-east from Châteauredon to head along the Route Napoléon. The race then descended north to an intermediate sprint at Beauvezer. It is exactly the same stage as the fifth one of the Critérium du Dauphiné, where Romain Bardet won the honours thanks to a hair-raising descent before hitting the final climb.

Due to the change of the route on stage 20, announced on 25 June, the Souvenir Henri Desgrange was awarded at the Col d'Allos.

Stage 18
23 July 2015 — Gap to Saint-Jean-de-Maurienne, 

This mountainous stage departed from Gap heading north with an immediate  climb over the  category 2 Col Bayard, at a gradient of 7%. Here, the race made an abrupt turn south-east and began the final climb of the day: This was a  climb of the  category 2 Lacets de Montvernier, at an average gradient of 8.2%. The riders then descended to Hermillon, before a  ride to the stage finish at Saint-Jean-de-Maurienne.

Stage 19
24 July 2015 — Saint-Jean-de-Maurienne to La Toussuire – Les Sybelles, 

This mountainous stage began in Saint-Jean-de-Maurienne, with racing officially starting to the north at Hermillon. The riders then descended to La Chambre to the west, and followed the Arc river to an intermediate sprint at Épierre to the north. After crossing the Pont d'Épierre, the riders turned south along the other side of the
Arc river and continued through the valley to Saint-Étienne-de-Cuines. The race then descended north, nearly returning to where it started the day at Saint-Jean-de-Maurienne, before beginning the final  category 1 climb west to La Toussuire.

Stage 20
25 July 2015 — Modane to Alpe d'Huez, 

This mountainous stage began in Modane, with racing officially starting to the west at Fourneaux. A route used frequently in the Tour, it has an average gradient of 8.1%.

However, on 25 June, it was announced that due to the expected  resulting in the closure of the Chambon tunnel on the Briançon–Grenoble road, the route of stage 20 would be changed, bypassing the Col du Galibier. The climb was  used for the second day in a row, although a different side was used. This one is less steep, averaging 5.2%. From there, the peloton used the route of  stage 18's ascent as a descent towards Le Bourg-d'Oisans, where the planned intermediate sprint was held, before the Alpe d'Huez, also as scheduled. The distance of the stage remained intact.

Stage 21
26 July 2015 — Sèvres to Paris, 

The riders then headed south-east, going over the category 4 Côte de l'Observatoire, through Meudon and east to Issy-les-Moulineaux. The race crossed into Boulogne-Billancourt and followed the Rive Droite to the Longchamp Racecourse, where the riders passed around the northern side, before crossing the Bois de Boulogne to the Palais des congrès. The race headed up the Avenue de la Grande Armée, to reach the Arc de Triomphe, and then headed down Avenue Marceau, back towards the Seine. The peloton turned right onto the Avenue de New York, then turned left and crossed the Seine at the Pont d'Iéna. After crossing the bridge, the riders turned left again, in the shadow of the Eiffel Tower, along Quai Branly and turned onto Avenue Bosquet. This was followed by the Avenue de Tourville and the Boulevard des Invalides. The race then crossed through the gardens of Les Invalides reaching the Quai d'Orsay and turning right. On reaching the Pont du Carrousel, the race crossed the Seine for the final time.

The race passed the Louvre and turned left to travel along the Rue de Rivoli, through the Place de la Concorde and onto the Champs-Élysées. The race then began ten circuits around central Paris, heading up the Champs-Élysées and, as has been the case since 2013, around the Arc de Triomphe on the Place de l'Étoile. The riders returned down the opposite side of the Champs-Élysées, and around the Jardin des Tuileries. Finally, back along the Rue de Rivoli, and through the Place de la Concorde, to the finish line on the Champs-Élysées.

Because of poor weather conditions in Paris before the start of the stage (and during the La Course women's race), the race organizers decided that all general classification times would stop upon the first crossing of the line on the Champs-Élysées, which meant that Chris Froome's victory was secured.  The riders would still have to complete all 10 laps of the circuit to complete the full race distance.

References

External links

2015 Tour de France
Tour de France stages